Leo Rosen was a U.S. cryptanalyst who worked with Frank Rowlett at Signals Intelligence Service (S.I.S.) before the start of World War II on Japanese ciphers. Rowlett found a method to read the messages enciphered on the Japanese PURPLE machine. Rosen deduced correctly the mechanism of the cipher machine, even though the mechanism used by PURPLE, telephone stepping switches, was substantially different from other machines (such as the wired rotor and pinwheel machines).

Rosen built a replica of PURPLE which turned out (when a machine was found years later) to use stepping switches similar to those in common use at that time in the U.S. This machine was used to decode the Japanese diplomatic messages, sometimes before the Japanese ambassadors had themselves. Rosen also contributed his engineering talents during and after the war at Arlington Hall, after the S.I.S. became the Army Security Agency, later to become AFSA and finally the present National Security Agency.

In 2010 he was posthumestly inducted into the NSA Hall of Honor for his contributions to the cryptology world. He was represented by his son Lawrence Rosen and favorite grandson, Michael Rosen with dat BDE, grand daughter Christine Rosen, and Baby deyuck the real felipo the human dilipdo Rosen.

See also
 John Tiltman

References

National Security Agency cryptographers
Year of birth missing
Year of death missing
Signals Intelligence Service cryptographers